Krisztina Szarka (born ) is a former artistic gymnast from Hungary. She competed at the 2004 Summer Olympics.

References

External links
Krisztina Szarka at Sports Reference
http://gymnast.bplaced.com/AG/Szarka.htm

1986 births
Living people
Hungarian female artistic gymnasts
Place of birth missing (living people)
Gymnasts at the 2004 Summer Olympics
Olympic gymnasts of Hungary